Rani Mukerji is an Indian actress who has won several awards and nominations. She made her film debut with a supporting role in the Bengali film Biyer Phool (1996), which was directed by her father Ram Mukherjee. She made her Hindi debut with Raja Ki Aayegi Baraat in 1996, for which she received her first award at the Star Screen Awards for Best Fresh Talent. The following year she was featured in two successful films. For her third movie, Kuch Kuch Hota Hai (1998), she earned the award for Best Supporting Actress at the 44th Filmfare Awards. She also won the Zee Cine Award for Best Actress in a Supporting Role and the Lux Face of the Year accolades at the Zee Cine Awards. Following this, she starred in several movies, some of which were critically and commercially successful, such as Hey Ram (2000) which was chosen as India's official entry to the Oscars and Badal (2000) which was one of the highest-grossing films of that year. For her performance in Har Dil Jo Pyar Karega (2000), she was nominated for Best Supporting Actress at the 46th Filmfare Awards and the following year she starred in Chori Chori Chupke Chupke (2001).

Mukerji was then noted for her role in Shaad Ali's marital drama Saathiya (2002). Her portrayal of a medical student who struggles with married life at a young age in the film earned her first Filmfare Award for Best Actress nomination and she also won her first Filmfare Award for Best Actress (Critics) at the same ceremony. The role garnered her several Best Actress nominations at major award ceremonies, including organizations like, International Indian Film Academy (IIFA), Zee Cine and Screen which also bestowed her with a Special Jury Award. She again garnered critical acclaim and commercial success with Chalte Chalte (2003), Yuva (2004), Hum Tum (2004), Veer-Zaara (2004), Black (2005), Bunty Aur Babli (2005), Kabhi Alvida Naa Kehna (2006), Ta Ra Rum Pum (2007),  Laaga Chunari Mein Daag (2007), Saawariya (2007), No One Killed Jessica (2011), Talaash: The Answer Lies Within (2012), Mardaani (2014), Hichki (2018) and Mardaani 2 (2019). All these movies earned her nominations and wins at major award ceremonies, of which Hum Tum (2004) and Black (2005) won her two Filmfare Awards for Best Actress and the latter also gave her the Filmfare Award for Best Actress (Critics). She won the Filmfare Award for Best Supporting Actress for Yuva (2004) and No One Killed Jessica (2011) respectively. She also received the Star Screen Award Jodi No. 1 for two consecutive years for her pairing opposite Abhishek Bachchan in Bunty Aur Babli (2005) and Shah Rukh Khan in Kabhi Alvida Naa Kehna (2006).

She got her Rajiv Gandhi Award in 2004, a national honor. Apart from winning merit awards based on her performances, Mukerji was awarded various non-acting honors at major award functions. These include being the Celebrity Model of the Year at the Idea Zee F Awards as well as the Most Stylish Actor at the MTV Lycra Awards. She has topped every Top Ten Actresses’ Listing by Filmfare for several consecutive years, often she is cited as the Ten Most Powerful Names of Bollywood, sometimes being the only woman making it to that list from year to year. Mukerji was chosen as the Best Television Personality of the Year for judging the show Dance Premier League (2009). IIFA-FICCI Frames has named her as one of the ten most powerful entertainers of the decade. In 2011, she was bestowed with the greatest honor, the Actor of the Decade Award, by the India Leadership Conclave's Indian Affairs's Business Leadership Awards as well as by the Kelvinator Gr8 Women Achievers Club. In 2013, Mukerji was honored by the US Council on the day of Barack Obama's inauguration into office for Contribution to Indian Cinema and TSR National Film Awards recognized her as Bollywood's Ever Shining Star. She was commemorated with Excellence in Acting at GQ India's Men of the Year Award that same year. In 2015, Mukerji was felicitated by The National Institute of Gender Justice towards her contribution to gender sensitization. In 2017, she was honored by the Prime Minister of Mauritius, Pravind Jugnauth, for her Outstanding Contribution to Cinema during Mauritius Cinema Week in celebration of 50 years of the country's independence from British rule.

Anandalok Puraskar Awards
The Anandalok Puraskar Awards ceremony is one of the most prominent film events for Bengali Cinema in India. Mukerji has received five awards over the past for the Hindi section.

Bengal Film Journalists' Association Awards
The Bengal Film Journalists' Association Awards were founded by the oldest Association of Film critics in 1937. It is one of the most prestigious awards held in India. Mukerji has received two awards.

BIG Star Entertainment Awards
The BIG Star Entertainment Awards is an awards ceremony for the Hindi film industry. Mukerji has won one award from seven nomination.

Bollywood Movie Awards
The Bollywood Movie Awards was an annual film award ceremony held in Long Island, New York, United States between 1999 and 2007 celebrating films and actors from the Bollywood film industry. Mukerji has won three awards from six nominations.

Filmfare Awards
The Filmfare Awards are presented annually by The Times Group to honor both artistic and technical excellence of professionals in the Hindi language film industry of India. Mukerji has won seven awards (most for any actress). Mukerji has been nominated 19 times in various categories, making her the most-nominated performer in the female categories. Mukerji is the first and only actress to have ever won both the Best Actress and Best Supporting Actress trophies in a single year (2005). She is also the first and only actress to date to win both the Best Actress and Best Actress (Critics) awards during the same year (2006) for the same film.

Global Indian Film Awards
The Global Indian Film Awards was an award ceremony for the Hindi film industry held abroad in 2005 and 2007, no longer held now. Mukerji has received one award from two nominations.

Indian Film Festival of Melbourne
The Indian Film Festival of Melbourne (IFFM) is an annual Indian film festival based in Melbourne, Australia. It is presented by Film Victoria and the State Government of Victoria, and produced by Mind Blowing Films, a Melbourne-based distributor of Indian cinema across Australia and New Zealand. Founded in 2010, the festival was previously called Bollywood & Beyond, and from 2012 was re-established as an initiative of the Victorian Coalition Government Victorian Government that aims to strengthen ties between the Indian film industry and Victoria.

International Indian Film Academy Awards
The International Indian Film Academy Awards are presented annually by the International Indian Film Academy to honour both artistic and technical excellence of professionals in Bollywood, the Hindi language film industry. Mukerji has won four awards from twelve nominations, including a special nomination for Star of the Decade – Female. She holds the record for the most wins in the Best Actress category, leading with three consecutive wins.

Lions Gold Awards

Sabsey Favourite Kaun Awards
The Sabse Favourite Kaun Awards were presented annually by Star Gold. The nominees and awardees were decided by public voting after a voting campaign spanning across 30 cities all over India. Votes are usually sent via the official website and through SMS. The awards were discontinued after 2010. Mukerji holds the record for the most awards, all four wins were consecutive wins.

Sansui Viewer's Choice Awards
The Sansui Viewer's Choice Awards was an annual awards ceremony presented to the Bollywood film industry, which were boycotted by Shah Rukh Khan in 2005, now no longer held. Mukerji has won one award from three nominations.

Screen Awards
The Screen Awards is the only award ceremony in India to be involved with the Executive Director and the Governor of the Academy of Motion Picture Arts and Sciences. They are presented annually to honor professional excellence in the Hindi language film industry of India. Mukerji has garnered seven wins from eighteen nominations, including two wins and one nomination for Jodi No. 1 (with Abhishek Bachchan in 2005 and 2006 and Shahrukh Khan in 2007).

Star Guild Awards
The Star Guild Awards are presented by the Bollywood film industry to honor and recognize the professional excellence of their peers. Mukerji has received one award from five nominations.

Stardust Awards
The Stardust Awards is an award ceremony presented annually by Stardust magazine. Mukerji has won two awards from ten nominations.

Times of India Film Awards
The Times of India Film Awards is envisioned to be popular choice awards where Bollywood fans across the world vote on the nomination categories to determine the winners of the popular choice categories.

Zee Cine Awards
The Zee Cine Awards is an award ceremony for the Hindi film industry, now held abroad each year. Mukerji has won four awards from twelve nominations.

Other awards

Media honours
In addition to the industry awards, Mukerji has received various kinds of honours from noted magazines.

https://www.koimoi.com/bollywood-audience-poll-2019/koimoi-audience-poll-2019-winners-full-list-from-shahid-kapoor-kabir-singh-rani-mukerji-to-uri-full-list-of-winners/
 2004: Rajiv Gandhi Award for her contribution to the entertainment industry.
 2005: Mukerji was the only actor to be invited by the Indian Prime Minister Manmohan Singh for the official banquet in honour of visiting Pakistan President General Pervez Musharraf.
2005: Mukerji was the guest of honour at the state dinner, in honour of the Singapore Prime Minister Lee Hsien Loong
 2009: Mukerji was among the ten recipients of IIFA-FICCI Frames' award for Most Powerful Entertainers of the Decade.
 2009: GQ Excellence Award for Achievement in Films.
Anandalok Purashkar
 Best Actress (Critics) – Rani Mukerji
https://www.deccanchronicle.com/amp/131125/entertainment-bollywood/article/rekha-bonds-rani
 2011: Kelvinator Gr8 Women Achievers Award Actor of the Decade.
 2011: Young Women Achievers Award Excellence in Cinema.
 2012: PETA India acknowledged Mukerji with a Hero to Animals Award for her compassionate work for animals.
 2013: Mukerji was honored by the US Council on the day of Barack Obama's inauguration into office for Contribution to Indian Cinema.
https://www.bollywoodlife.com/news/john-abraham-rani-mukherji-and-preity-zinta-to-be-awarded-at-asiavision-movie-awards-287075/
 2013: Honored at the 3rd Petrochem GR8! Women Awards in Dubai for Most Successful Actress.
 2013: Commemorated with Excellence in Acting at GQ India's Men of the Year Awards.
 2013: Honored at the 19th Kolkata International Film Festival with Panch Kanya Award.
 2015: Felicitated at a charity dinner hosted by The British Asian Trust in London for her Contribution to the fight against human trafficking.
 2015: Felicitated by Mumbai University for her Contribution to Indian Cinema.
 2015: Felicitated by National Institute of Gender Justice for her Contribution towards Gender Sensitization.
 2017: Recognized and honored by the Prime Minister of Mauritius, Pravind Jugnauth, for her Outstanding Contribution to Cinema.
https://affairscloud.com/winners-of-dadasaheb-phalke-excellence-awards-2018/
 2018: Felicitated at the NBT Utsav Awards for her immense contribution in promotion of Indian language, culture and art through her perseverance, performance and love for the craft
 2018: Hoists Indian National Flag at the Indian Film Festival of Melbourne (IFFM)
2018: Honored at Lead the Change Pride Awards for her life changing portrayal of an aspiring teacher having Tourette Syndrome in Hichki by WCRC and KVG Media
2018: Honored at the Forbes India Tycoons of Tomorrow with Icon Of Cinema for her exemplary contribution in the field of cinema and entertainment
2018: Awarded the Sakhi Sanman for her contribution to cinema  at the Lokmat Woman's Summit
2019: Awarded with Most Powerful Performer of the Year 2018 for Hichki at Maharashtra Achievers Awards
2019: Honoured with the Most Influential Cinema Personality in South-East Asia at Asian Business Leaders Conclave 
2022: Honoured with Best Actress Bollywood of the Year in the Bollywood Life Awards 2022

Notes

References 

Lists of awards received by Indian actor